Kimodameshi ( or ;  "test one's liver"), or test of courage is a Japanese activity in which people explore frightening, and potentially dangerous, places to build up courage.

Kimodameshi is usually played in the summer, in group activities such as school club trips or camping. At night, group of people visit an ominous place such as a cemetery, haunted house or forest path to carry out specific missions there. The exercise teaches the group that, working together, they can overcome their fear.

See also
 Ghost hunting
 Legend tripping
 Haunted house
 Hyakumonogatari Kaidankai
 Kaidan, Japanese ghost stories

References

Japanese culture
Ghosts
Parapsychology
Pseudoscience
Hobbies